Emilio Bianchi (born in Rho, Lombardy, 8 October 1957) is an Italian broadcast journalist.

His radio debut was on Radio Reporter on 22 June 1976, on the program "Aperitivo Musicale" (Musical Aperitif). He later hosted The Buongiorno Reporter (later renamed The Emilio Bianchi Show) program broadcast at 6 am.

When the TeleReporter station started broadcasting in 1977, Bianchi became one of their principal news reporters. In 1987 TeleReporter was transferred to Odeon TV, so Bianchi left television, but he continued his association with Radio Reporter. In 1988, he started to work with the TV groups Fininvest (now Mediaset) and 7 Gold, for whom he was a sports journalist for 11 years.

On 19 May 2006 he resigned from Radio Reporter and moved to Number One Radio, where he continued to lead a 3-hour-long program, the "Emilio Bianchi Show", five days a week.

In December 2006 he left Italia 7 Gold and moved to Telelombardia and Antenna 3, where he is a sports commentator.

References 

1957 births
Living people
People from Rho, Lombardy
Italian television journalists
Italian radio journalists
Sports commentators